Andrew Flett (7 December 1875 – 15 July 1961) was a Scotland international rugby union player. He was the 34th President of the Scottish Rugby Union.

Rugby Union career

Amateur career

Flett played rugby union for Edinburgh University.

Provincial career

He played for Edinburgh District in the 1901 Inter-City match against Glasgow District.

International career

Flett had 5 caps for Scotland, playing in the 1901 and 1902 Home Nations Championship.

Referee career

He refereed the Glasgow District v Canada match on 20 December 1902.

Administrative career

Flett became the 34th President of the Scottish Rugby Union. He served one year from 1907 to 1908.

References

1875 births
1961 deaths
Scottish rugby union players
Rugby union forwards
Scotland international rugby union players
Edinburgh District (rugby union) players
Scottish rugby union referees
Edinburgh University RFC players
Scottish Districts referees
Presidents of the Scottish Rugby Union
Rugby union players from Edinburgh